The first season of the crime and action drama Magnum P.I. premiered on September 24, 2018, on CBS, for the 2018–19 United States network television schedule. The series is a remake of the 1980 series of the same name and centers on Thomas Magnum, a former Navy SEAL who works as a private investigator and solves mysteries with the help of his friends. The season stars Jay Hernandez, Perdita Weeks, Zachary Knighton, and Stephen Hill. Amy Hill and Tim Kang also appear in the series and joined in the series third episode. CBS first announced the series on October 20, 2017; it was initially given a thirteen episode order but an additional seven were ordered bringing the total to twenty. Multiple Hawaii Five-0 stars appeared as their Hawaii Five-0 characters in guest roles throughout the season in minor crossover events.

The season was viewed by an average of 8.36 million viewers and ranked 37 out of all television series for the season. "I Saw The Sun Rise", the series premiere, brought in 8.12 million viewers while "The Day It All Came Together", the season finale was viewed by 5.54 million. "Winner Takes All", the seasons twelfth episode, aired directly after the American Football Conference championship causing it to be the highest viewed episode of the season at 8.76 million. The season primarily received mixed reviews from both critics and viewers and was nominated for two Imagen Awards, one of which was won. The season concluded on April 1, 2019, and despite the mixed reviews Magnum P.I. was renewed for a second season which premiered on September 27, 2019.

Cast and characters

Main
 Jay Hernandez as Thomas Magnum, a former Navy SEAL who is a security consultant for the successful novelist Robin Masters, living in the guest house on his estate, while also working as a private investigator
 Perdita Weeks as Juliet Higgins, a former MI6 agent who is majordomo to Robin Masters; she and Magnum bicker but become allies
 Zachary Knighton as Orville "Rick" Wright, a Marine veteran and former door gunner, who is also a playboy
 Stephen Hill as Theodore "T.C." Calvin, a Marine veteran and helicopter pilot who runs helicopter tours of Hawaii and is a member of Magnum's team
 Amy Hill as Teuila "Kumu" Tuileta, the cultural curator of Robin Masters' estate
 Tim Kang as Honolulu Police Department (HPD) Detective Gordon Katsumoto, who dislikes Magnum but usually comes to the team's aid when needed

Recurring
 Domenick Lombardozzi as Sebastian Nuzo
 Christopher Thornton as Kenny "Shammy" Shamberg

Notable guests

 Sung Kang as HPD Lieutenant Yoshi Tanaka
 Ken Jeong as Luther Gillis
 Carl Weathers as Dan Sawyer
 Elisabeth Röhm as Brooke Mason
 Cyndi Lauper as Vanessa Nero
 Ben Vereen as Henry Barr
 Corbin Bernsen as Francis "Icepick" Hofstetler
 Jamie-Lynn Sigler as Toni
 Ryan Blaney as Shane Powell
 Eddie George as Travis Leet
 Jordana Brewster as Hannah
 Christian Yelich as himself
 Roger E. Mosley as John Booky
 Brooke Lyons as Abby Miller

Crossover

 Kimee Balmilero as Dr. Noelani Cunha
 Taylor Wily as Kamekona Tupuola
 Dennis Chun as HPD Sergeant Duke Lukela
 Kala Alexander as Kawika

Episodes

The number in the "No. overall" column refers to the episode's number within the overall series, whereas the number in the "No. in season" column refers to the episode's number within this particular season. Numerous episodes are named after similarly named episodes from the original series. "Production code" refers to the order in which the episodes were produced while "U.S. viewers (millions)" refers to the number of viewers in the U.S. in millions who watched the episode as it was aired.

Crossovers

On July 19, 2018, it was announced that the season would see multiple crossovers with the ninth season of Hawaii Five-0. Lenkov later confirmed the announcement and Kimee Balmilero as well as Taylor Wily made guest appearances as their Five-0 characters in episodes one and two of Magnum P.I., respectively. Meanwhile, Alex O'Loughlin's character, Steve McGarrett was set to cross paths with Hernandez's Thomas Magnum, later in the season in a crossover event, however a full crossover event did not air until the following television season. Balmilero and Wily continued to make guest appearances throughout the first season. Dennis Chun appeared in the seventeenth episode.

Production

Development

On September 22, 2016, it was reported that ABC was developing a sequel to Magnum, P.I. centered around Thomas Magnum's daughter Lily. ABC gave the series a script commitment plus substantial penalty. The project was led by Leverage creator John Rogers with Eva Longoria and her UnbeliEVAble Entertainment company. Rogers was also announced to be writing the script; Rogers, Longoria, Ben Spector, and Jennifer Court also signed on as executive producers. Universal Television, who owned the rights to the original series, was reported as the production studio. No further updates on the project were given but nearly a year later on October 20, 2017, it was announced that CBS was developing a reboot of the original series from Peter M. Lenkov who also developed the Five-0 and MacGyver reboots. At the time CBS ordered a pilot production commitment for the series. Lenkov and Eric Guggenheim, Five-0 writer and co-showrunner, were announced as the writers for the pilot. Lenkov, Guggenheim, and The Blacklist producers John Davis and John Fox of Davis Entertainment were reported as executive producers. CBS Television Studios and Universal Television co-produced the series. Danielle Woodrow was also later announced to be serving as an executive producer on the series. The series was initially picked up by CBS for thirteen episodes and an additional seven episodes were later ordered. Magnum P.I. was renewed for a second season which premiered on September 27, 2019.

Filming
The pilot episode filmed in March and April of 2018 at Hawaii Film Studio. The pilot was directed by Justin Lin, who also directed other CBS pilots for Scorpion and the 2018 reboot of S.W.A.T. The rest of the season began filming on July 23, 2018, with a traditional Hawaiian blessing. Primary filming for the series takes place in the state of Hawaii on the island of O'ahu at Kalaeloa Studio where Inhumans previously filmed. The fictional Robin’s Nest Estate where Magnum and Higgins lives is located at Kalaeloa Ranch a location which Jurassic World also used as a filming location. Other filming locations include numerous beaches including Maili, Waikiki, and Kapolei. On Wednesday, August 22, 2018, with the anticipated landfall of Hurricane Lane, a Category 4 hurricane in Hawaii, CBS reported that they "were closely monitoring the situation" but that production would continue as planned. The following day CBS temporarily shut down production of both Five-0 and Magnum P.I. until further notice.

Casting

When the series was announced it was reported that CBS intended to genderswap the character of Jonathan Higgins and rename the character Juliet Higgins. On February 2, 2018 Deadline Hollywood reported that CBS was looking for a non-white actor to lead the series in an effort to have diverse casts. It was later announced that Jay Hernandez had been cast as the title character Thomas Magnum, who was portrayed by Tom Selleck in the original series. Perdita Weeks was cast as Higgins on March 2, 2018. Zachary Knighton and Stephen Hill were later cast as Orville "Rick" Wright and Theodore "T.C." Calvin, respectively. Tim Kang and Amy Hill were the last two to be cast in the series as Detective Gordon Katsumoto and Kumu, respectively. Amy Hill was originally cast as a recurring character with the option to be upgraded to a series regular; she was upped to a series regular before her first episode aired. Both Amy Hill and Kang debuted in the seasons third episode.

Kimee Balmilero, Taylor Wily, and Dennis Chun all appeared as their Five-0 characters in seven, two, and one episodes, respectively. Chun previously appeared in the original Magnum, P.I. as various minor characters throughout its run. Domenick Lombardozzi, Ken Jeong, and Christopher Thornton were cast in recurring roles and appeared throughout the season. Former NFL and CFL football player, Carl Weathers, MLB baseball player, Christian Yelich, and NASCAR driver Ryan Blaney all appeared as guest stars. Elisabeth Röhm and Corbin Bernsen who previously portrayed characters in Five-0, while Röhm's character was also mentioned in MacGyver, both appeared in the season as different characters. Singer/songwriter Cyndi Lauper also appeared as a guest star in the seasons fifth episode. Roger E. Mosley who starred as Theodore Calvin in the original Magnum, P.I. guest starred in one episode. Selleck stated in an interview that he would never appear in the series even though he was asked as not to take away from the original Magnum, P.I. and due to conflicting filming of Blue Bloods which also airs on CBS.

Marketing and release
The pilot episode was screened at San Diego Comic Con on July 19, 2018, followed by a question and answer panel with Lenkov, Guggenheim, Hernandez, Weeks, Knighton, and Stephen Hill. On August 13, 2018, it was announced that the series would have an advanced premiere screening along with an advanced premiere screening of the Five-0 ninth season premiere. The annual event which had previously had only been marketed with Five-0 is known as "Sunset on the Beach", featured interviews with the cast and crew as well as a special performance by Cyndi Lauper, and was scheduled to take place on September 14, 2018, at Waikiki beach in Honolulu, Hawaii. It was later rescheduled to September 16, as a result of the Category 4 Hurricane Olivia. The series premiered on CBS on September 24, 2018 for the 2018–19 United States network television schedule. All episodes aired on Mondays at 9:00 pm ET with the exception of the twelfth episode, "Winner Takes All", which aired on Sunday, January 20, at 10:00 pm ET, immediately following the 2019 American Football Conference championship game. The season later concluded on April 1, 2019, after airing 20 episodes. In the United Kingdom Magnum P.I. began airing on Sky One on January 16, 2019. CTV purchased the rights to air the series in Canada on May 31, 2018, and aired the season in simulcast with CBS.

Reception

Critical response
The review aggregator website Rotten Tomatoes gives the first season a score of 57% with an average rating of 6.35/10. The critics consensus states "The rebooted Magnum P.I. may not be quite distinctive enough to hold up to comparisons with its source material, but a charismatic star, slickly staged action, and a handful of modern twists hint at greater potential." Metacritic, which uses a weighted average, gives the season a 48 out of 100 indicating "mixed or average reviews". Prior to the first episodes airing Digital Spy said that rebooting Magnum, P.I. was a "terrible idea". The original announcement received a primarily negative response from fans of the original but later received mixed reviews after the series premiered. When comparing the season to the original series USA Today stated that "Magnum (the P.I.) isn't the same, but for better or worse, he isn't all that different, either." Deadline Hollywood called the opening scene to the pilot episode "unbelievable" but later said "this new take on Magnum P.I. isn’t just a stunt to feed a hunger for nostalgia. It’s a fun action series that will provide entertaining television that has the spirit of the classic but with modern appeal."

Awards and nominations
The season was nominated for two Imagen Awards at the 34th Annual Imagen Awards. The season as a whole was nominated for Best Primetime Drama Program. The award was won and tied with the FX drama Pose. Additionally, Hernandez was nominated for Best Television Actor. The award was lost to Jon Seda for his work on the NBC police procedural Chicago P.D.

Viewing figures

Home media

References

2018 American television seasons
2019 American television seasons
Magnum, P.I.